IUCC may refer to:
 Aerobactin synthase, an enzyme
 Israel Inter-University Computation Center
 Information Unit for Climate Change, a former unit of the United Nations Environment Programme